This is a list of notable footballers who have played for Hibernian from the formation of the club in 1875 to present. It generally includes only players who made more than 100 league appearances for the club, but some players with fewer than 100 appearances are also included. This includes players who have set a club record, such as most appearances, most goals or biggest transfer fee.

Some of the players listed made few or no league appearances for Hibs, due to their playing for the club before it entered the Scottish Football League in 1893.

The club first created a hall of fame in July 2010 to mark its 135th birthday. The first group of nominees were publicised in August 2010 and were inducted at a dinner on 15 October. Further groups of players were inducted in November 2012 and February 2017.

Notable players

Key to positions
 GK — Goalkeeper
 DF — Defender
 MF — Midfielder
 FW — Forward

Bold type indicates that the player currently plays for the club.

International players

This is a list of Hibernian players who have been capped at full international level by their country whilst at the club. The Hibernian Historical Trust staged an exhibition of memorabilia relating to these international players at Easter Road during the summer of 2008. Despite the club having an Irish heritage, the first Hibs player to represent a national team other than Scotland was when Bobby Atherton played for Wales in 1899. Lawrie Reilly won the most caps while a Hibs player, with 38 for Scotland.



Algeria

Abderraouf Zarabi

Australia

Martin Boyle
Jackson Irvine
Stuart Lovell
Jamie Maclaren
Mark Milligan

Austria

Alen Orman

Burundi

Gael Bigirimana

Canada

Paul Fenwick

Côte d'Ivoire

Sol Bamba

Cyprus

Alex Gogić

Ecuador

Ulises de la Cruz

England

Joe Baker

Finland

Jonatan Johansson
Mixu Paatelainen
Jarkko Wiss

Gambia

Pa Kujabi

Honduras

Jorge Claros

Iceland

Ólafur Gottskálksson

Ireland (IFA)

Paddy Farrell
Bill Gowdy
Jack Jones

Israel

Ofir Marciano

Lithuania

Deivydas Matulevičius
Vykintas Slivka

Morocco

Abdessalam Benjelloun
Merouane Zemmama

New Zealand

Chris Killen

Northern Ireland

Ryan McGivern
James McPake
Colin Murdock
Michael O'Neill
John Parke
Dean Shiels
Ivan Sproule

Norway

Niklas Gunnarsson

Philippines

Yrik Galantes

Republic of Ireland / Ireland (FAI)

Paddy Farrell
Nick Colgan
Mike Gallagher
Daryl Horgan
Liam Miller

Republic of the Congo

Dominique Malonga

Scotland

John Blackley
Des Bremner
Bernard Breslin
Scott Brown
John Brownlie
Gary Caldwell
Paddy Callaghan
John Collins
Bobby Combe
Peter Cormack
Alex Cropley
Arthur Duncan
James Dunn
Steven Fletcher
Robert Glen
Andy Goram
Jock Govan
John Grant
Archie Gray
Leigh Griffiths
Willie Groves
Willie Hamilton
Paul Hanlon
Bill Harper
Joe Harper
Hugh Howie
Darren Jackson
Bobby Johnstone
John Kennedy
Peter Kerr
Jim Leighton
James Lundie
Johnny MacLeod
Murdo MacLeod
James Main
Neil Martin
William McCartney
Dylan McGeouch
James McGhee
John McGinn
Paul McGinn
James McLaren
Marc McNulty
Ian Murray
Pat Murray
Robert Neil
Kevin Nisbet
Garry O'Connor
John O'Neil
Willie Ormond
Ryan Porteous
Lawrie Reilly
Harry Rennie
Derek Riordan
Harry Ritchie
William Robb
Alan Rough
Erich Schaedler
Jim Scott
Davie Shaw
Gordon Smith
Pat Stanton
Lewis Stevenson
George Stewart
Eddie Turnbull
Duncan Urquhart
Keith Wright
Tommy Younger

Saint Lucia

Earl Jean

Trinidad and Tobago

Lyndon Andrews
Russell Latapy
Tony Rougier

Wales

Bobby Atherton
Owain Tudur Jones

Notes

Bibliography

References

External links

London Hearts' record of Scotland caps won by Hibernian players
Scottish Football Association National team archive
National Football Teams

Players
 
Hibernian
Association football player non-biographical articles
Players